Wanita May (born January 30, 1975 in Grimsby, Ontario) is a Canadian high jumper. She started competing at age 16 and participated in World Junior Championships in 1992. She went on to place first in the Canadian Championships in 2000, 2001 and 2003.

Results 

2004 Canadian Olympic Trials 1st 
2003 Canadian Championships 1st 
2002 Canadian Championships 4th 
2001 Canadian Championships 1st 
2001 Francophone Games 1st 
2001 World Championships 15th 
2001 Canadian Championships 1st 
2000 Canadian Championships 1st 
1999 Canadian Championships 2nd 
1997 Canadian Championships 5th

Canadian Jr Record 1.92m
Ontario Indoor Record 1.91 (sr)

Wanita (née Dykstra) May started competing at the age of 16 years.  She broke the Canadian Junior record at the age of 18, jumping 1.92m. She attended Kansas State University on a track scholarship, graduating with a BS degree in Kinesiology. She also competed in the Pentathlon (holds the Canadian High Jump Pentathlon Record) and Heptathlon. She was runner up at the 1994 indoor NCAA competition, also placing 4th and 6th at NCAAs. She continued to compete after college, representing Canada on numerous occasions.  Retired in 2005, after the birth of her first child.

Interesting Facts:
1. Wanita stands 1.70 cm, her personal best is 1.92 cm - that is 22 cm over her head that she has jumped (for the imperial system - she is 5'7" and her PR is 6'3.5"

Holds Canadian record for greatest physical height to jump height differential (female)

Wanita May is also a writer. She publishes under the name of W.J. May. Her debut novel: Rae of Hope, is the first book in the Chronicles of Kerrigan. She is a USA Today Bestselling author.

External links 
 
Wanita May's writing website - http://www.wjmaybooks.com
 Athletics Canada bio 

Living people
1975 births
Canadian female high jumpers
People from Grimsby, Ontario